Qarah Kowshan (also Romanized as Qarah Kūshan) is a village in Ujan-e Gharbi Rural District, in the Central District of Bostanabad County, East Azerbaijan Province, Iran. At the 2006 census, its population was 844, in 138 families.

References 

Populated places in Bostanabad County